Dublin is a borough in Bucks County, Pennsylvania. The population was 2,158 at the 2010 census. Dublin is part of Pennridge School District.

Geography
Dublin is located at  (40.373270, -75.202464).

History
Prior to the arrival of europeans the area was occupied by the Lenape people. Early settlers were predominately Irish followed by Germans. Local lore holds that the second tavern built on the site of the first tavern was a double log cabin with a chimney built between them, and that the name was derived from "Double Inn", but there is no documentation to support this. It is likely that the name was derived from the city in Ireland. A letter written by Reverend Uriah DuBois date Durham, April 21, 1798 is the first known mention of Dublin.

In 1832, locals attempted to erect Dublin into a township. The petition signed by _ Angelmoyer, Samuel Angeny, Isaac Bechtel, Enos Cassel, Isaac Cassel, Joseph Detweiler, Christian Eckert, Philip Fluck, Abraham Fritz, Enos Hunsberger, Samuel Kile, Dielman Kolb, Henry Kolb, Jacob Kolb, Michael Kulp, Joseph Moyer, Samuel Moyer, Daniel Richert, John Wats and Samuel Wright was presented to Judge John Fox, failed. A second attempt in 1841 included some residents of New Britain Township also failed. Dublin was finally erected into a borough in 1912.

The first post office of Dublin was opened on April 18, 1827, Newton Rowland, postmaster. Prior to 1827, mail was delivered from Doylestown and Hilltown. William Rowland of Dublin served in the Pennsylvania General Assembly from 1812-1815. For many years, J. D. Moyer & Co. was one of the largest and most successful country stores in the county.

Overview

Dublin extends along a stretch of Pennsylvania Route 313 which connects the much larger towns of Doylestown and Quakertown. Almost the entire town can be viewed from PA 313 with only a few streets diverging from the main road. The town is surrounded by sparse housing developments and a series of dairy farms and nurseries, all of which are part of Hilltown Township and Bedminster Township. Dublin contains a small shopping center, a PennDOT Driver License Center, a pharmacy and 5 restaurants. Several rows of old houses line PA 313, some of which date back to the late 18th century. The majority of Dublin's population lives in several developments around the main part of town. Dublin has its own municipal government and maintains a fire station. Dublin has its own local police department and relies on Pennsylvania State Police when not on duty.

Demographics

As of the 2010 census, the borough was 90.5% White, 1.4% Black or African American, 0.1% Native American, 2.0% Asian, and 2.1% were two or more races. 8.9% of the population were of Hispanic or Latino ancestry.

As of the census of 2000, there were 2,083 people, 851 households, and 520 families residing in the borough. The population density was 3,825.7 people per square mile (1,489.4/km²). There were 869 housing units at an average density of 1,596.0 per square mile (621.3/km²). The racial makeup of the borough was 93.90% White, 1.59% African American, 0.19% Native American, 1.15% Asian, 0.14% Pacific Islander, 0.48% from other races, and 1.44% from two or more races. Hispanic or Latino of any race were 1.97% of the population.

There were 851 households, out of which 35.4% had children under the age of 18 living with them, 47.7% were married couples living together, 9.3% had a female householder with no husband present, and 38.8% were non-families. 29.1% of all households were made up of individuals, and 6.5% had someone living alone who was 65 years of age or older. The average household size was 2.45 and the average family size was 3.10.

In the borough, the population was spread out, with 26.4% under the age of 18, 10.3% from 18 to 24, 38.5% from 25 to 44, 16.5% from 45 to 64, and 8.3% who were 65 years of age or older. The median age was 32 years. For every 100 females there were 98.6 males. For every 100 females age 18 and over, there were 99.6 males.

The median income for a household in the borough was $48,235, and the median income for a family was $55,724. Males had a median income of $37,441 versus $26,589 for females. The per capita income for the borough was $21,778. About 4.3% of families and 6.2% of the population were below the poverty line, including 6.2% of those under age 18 and 7.0% of those age 65 or over.

Transportation

Pennsylvania Route 313 is the only numbered highway serving Dublin. It follows Main Street on a northwest-southeast alignment through the center of the borough.

Climate
According to the Köppen climate classification system, Dublin has a Hot-summer, Humid continental climate (Dfa). Dfa climates are characterized by at least one month having an average mean temperature ≤ , at least four months with an average mean temperature ≥ , at least one month with an average mean temperature ≥  and no significant precipitation difference between seasons. Although most summer days are slightly humid in Dublin, episodes of heat and high humidity can occur, with heat index values > . The average wettest month is July, which corresponds with the annual peak in thunderstorm activity. Episodes of extreme cold and wind can occur, with wind chill values < . Ice storms and large snowstorms depositing ≥  of snow occur once every few years, particularly during nor’easters from December through February.

Ecology
According to the A. W. Kuchler U.S. potential natural vegetation types, Dublin would have a dominant vegetation type of Appalachian Oak (104) with a dominant vegetation form of Eastern Hardwood Forest (25). The spring bloom typically begins by April 14 and fall color usually peaks by October 26.

Gallery

References

External links
 

1912 establishments in Pennsylvania
Boroughs in Bucks County, Pennsylvania
Boroughs in Pennsylvania
Populated places established in 1912